Henry Cohen may refer to:

Henry Cohen (numismatist) (1806–1880), French numismatist, bibliographer and composer
Henry Cohen (rabbi) (1863–1952), Jewish Texan rabbi in Galveston, Texas, 1888–1952
Henry Cohen (politician) (1872–1942), Australian politician
Henry Cohen, 1st Baron Cohen of Birkenhead (1900–1977), British physician, doctor and lecturer
Henry Cohen (civil servant) (1922–1999), director of the third largest Displaced Persons camp in the American sector of post-WWII Germany in 1946
Henry Cohen (judge) (1840–1912), judge and politician in New South Wales, Australia.

See also
Henri Cohen (disambiguation)
Harry Cohen (disambiguation)